The detective dénouement is a variant of the literary dénouement common to mystery stories.

Overview
Detective dénouement was first popularized by the Sherlock Holmes novels, but is present in many stories, such as the works of Agatha Christie or in Ellen Raskin's young adult novel The Westing Game.

In detective stories, the dénouement is the segment of a mystery novel in which the protagonist of the story, or a character serving in his or her stead, reveals all the clues and lays out the conclusion for the other characters. This is usually in an attempt to show readers how the character came to the conclusion and solved the mystery. A famous example of the detective dénouement is the explanatory speech given by a forensic psychologist after the climax of the 1960 film Psycho. In the U.S. television series Monk, the title character (Adrian Monk) usually uses this method with the words "here's what happened". A black-and-white montage of the events prior to the murder accompanies his narration.

References

Fiction